Western Pwo, or Delta Pwo, is a Karen language of Burma with 210,000 estimated speakers.  It is not intelligible with other varieties of Pwo. There is little dialectal variation.

Distribution
Ayeyarwady Region: Einme, Maubin, Pathein, Twante, Kyonpyaw and Hinthada towns

References

Karenic languages